The EADS Mako/High Energy Advanced Trainer (Mako/HEAT) was a high-performance jet trainer or light attack aircraft intended for service with several European air forces. EADS proposed the Mako for the Eurotrainer program. The program was the final result of the AT-2000 project.

Design and development
The Mako design featured a single aft-mounted jet engine, fed by two air intake ramps at the roots of the mid-fuselage-wing.  It features a trapezoidal wing with a sharp taper.  The horizontal tail was an all-flying unit mounted close behind the wing and at nearly the same height.  The retractable landing gear was a tricycle unit. The two occupants shared a highly streamlined bubble canopy.

Subcontractors would have included Diehl Aerospace, Aermacchi (now Leonardo),  Saab, EAB and Dassault Aviation.

The Mako shows remarkable stealth aircraft features, partially due to faceting and partially due to composite materials, using some results from the MBB Lampyridae stealth program.

The intended engine was the General Electric F414M, which is a slightly derated version (at 75 kN) of the standard F414.

The Mako/HEAT was to be deployed at three shared bases around the continent of Europe, for use by all partner nations. There were nine candidate bases in seven countries, but no final selection was made.

The Mako/HEAT bid for the 1998 South African Air Force strategic procurement project, but lost to the BAE Hawk and Saab Gripen.

Specifications

See also

References

External links
 UAE chooses M-346 as advanced lead-in fighter trainer
 Italy Orders M346 Jet Trainers

Cancelled military aircraft projects
Airbus Defence and Space aircraft
2000s international military trainer aircraft
Single-engined jet aircraft
Delta-wing aircraft
Stealth aircraft